Schizorhizidae is an extinct family of cartilaginous fish from the Late Cretaceous belonging to the suborder Sclerorhynchoidei. This family contains the genera Harranahynchus and Schizorhiza. It was originally named as a subfamily of Sclerorhynchidae, but was later raised to the rank of family.

References

Rajiformes
Prehistoric fish families